Warren Klein (born July 27, 1944) is an American musician and songwriter, best known for being a founding member & lead guitarist of The Factory with Lowell George (produced by Frank Zappa), as a member of Fraternity of Man (Don't Bogart Me), and for being a guitarist in The Stooges with Iggy Pop in the spring of 1973.

Early life
Warren Klein was born in Queens New York but grew up in suburban Detroit. He became interested in science and electronics in high school where he and a few others were building a cyclotron particle accelerator, an unheard of project for high school students. Klein built the electronics to control it before moving to Westbury New York at age 17. There he met a contingent of folk musicians and fell in love with the guitar and acoustic guitar finger picking which led to him studying with folk music icon Dave Van Ronk, the “Mayor of McDougal Street” and host of the famous hootenannies at the Gaslight Café featuring performances by the likes of Bob Dylan and other folk music greats. This was the beginning of the end of his science studies despite getting a full work/study scholarship at Pratt institute from the Navy. He was given secret clearance to work at the Naval Applied Science Lab in the Brooklyn Navy Yard, but spent most of his study time playing guitar.

Career
Leaving his scholarship at Pratt Institute, Klein grabbed his guitar and a sleeping bag and headed to California in a drive-away to Colorado. While hitchhiking in the Colorado desert he was thankfully picked up by the Siebrand Brothers Circus and Carnival, stayed with them for a few weeks for a once in a lifetime adventure, then headed off to California where he hoped to start a career in music.

After arriving in Los Angeles Klein became a founding member, lead guitarist, and co-writer in The Factory with Lowell George. They were produced by Frank Zappa and played the notorious “Freak Out” & “Freak In” shows along with the Mothers of Invention at the Shrine Auditorium and Earl Warren Showgrounds. They had several singles released on Uni Records, & their remaining recorded material was later released as “Lowell George & The Factory” on Rhino Records.

When Ravi Shankar started the Kinnara School of Indian Music in Los Angeles, Klein took the opportunity to study sitar and was accepted as a disciple by Ravi not long after. At Ravi's request, Klein composed and performed the electric guitar music over the montage of stills in the Academy Award-winning movie, Charly.

After the Factory broke up, Klein joined the group Fraternity of Man best known for the single “Don't Bogart That Joint” taken from their ABC Dunhill album that was featured in the classic movie Easy Rider. Klein played all the psychedelic leads with the band as well as writing the song “Wispy Paisley Skies” which was in Ang Lee's movie Taking Woodstock. The band played at the Magic Mountain Music Festival, the San Francisco Pop Festival, the Hollywood Bowl, numerous love-ins, and a tour with Canned Heat.

Klein then put together The Emergency with Drachen Theaker (The Crazy World of Arthur Brown) and later formed the groups Tornado, Lazer (the original), and The Wolves with Niki Oosterveen. His relationship with Niki, who was managed by film producer Jon Peters, led to him playing the guitar solo that Barbra Streisand dances to in The Main Event.

Other bands he played in were the band Road with Jimi Hendrix's bassist Noel Redding, the band Tarantula at the Vancouver Pop Festival, and The Incredibly Strung-Out Band with Peter Case. When Iggy and The Stooges needed a guitarist for a concert in Chicago, Klein (then nicknamed “Tornado”) was the guy to fill in. .

Interview
https://www.i94bar.com/interviews/a-tornado-in-the-eye-of-a-storm

Discography
A partial discography of his recordings includes:

Various Artists, Where the Action Is! Los Angeles Nuggets 1965–1968 – Guitar
Peter Case, Who's Gonna Go Your Crooked Mile? – Tamboura
Peter Case, Beeline – Tamboura
Peter Case, Peter Case- Tamboura
Little Feat, Hotcakes & Outtakes: 30 Years of Little Feat – Dulcimer, Guitar
Marshall Crenshaw, Downtown – Tamboura
Beck, Mutations – Tamboura, Sitar
Beck, "Nobody's Fault But My Own" – Tamboura, Sitar
Various Artists, All Day Thumbsucker Revisited – Guitar
Lowell George & The Factory, Lightning-Rod Man – Guitar, songwriter
Emil Richards & The Factory – Guitar, songwriter
Easy Rider Soundtrack – Guitar, composer
Broken Homes, Broken Homes – Tamboura
Kim Fowley, I'm Bad – Guitar
João Donato, A Bad Donato – Guitar
Echo Park Soundtrack – Sitar
Peter Ivers, Nirvana Cuba – Guitar
Fraternity of Man, Fraternity of Man 1968 Guitar, Sitar, Tamboura, songwriter
Fraternity of Man, Get It On – Guitar, Sitar, Tamboura
Judy Mayhan, "Moments" – Sitar

Movie credits
Easy Rider – Guitar and background vocals (Don't Bogart That Joint)
Grand Theft Auto - Guitar
The Main Event – Guitar for Barbra Streisand dance
Airplane! – Guitar
Charly – Guitar, Composer for the montage of stills
American Pop – Guitar
Love Potion No. 9 – Sitar
Taking Woodstock – Guitar & Songwriter (Whispy Paisly Skies)

Television credits
Stranger Things – song placement “Every Other Girl”
Dinah Shore Show – performed original song “Sweet Lady” with Stacy Keach
F-Troop – Lead Guitar performance.
Gomer Pyle, U.S.M.C. – Guitar performance, composer

References and footnotes

Living people
Place of birth missing (living people)
Guitarists from Michigan
1944 births